Socket F is a CPU socket designed by AMD for its Opteron line of CPUs released on August 15, 2006. In 2010 Socket F was replaced by Socket C32 for entry-level servers and Socket G34 for high-end servers.

Technical specifications 

The socket has 1207 pins on a 1.1mm pitch and employs a land grid array contact mechanism.

Socket F is primarily for use in AMD's server line and is considered to be in the same socket generation as Socket AM2, which is used for the Athlon 64 and Athlon 64 X2; as well as Socket S1, which is used for Turion 64 and Turion 64 X2 microprocessors.

AMD Quad FX platform 

Socket F is the base for the AMD Quad FX Platform (referred to as "4x4" or "QuadFather" prior to release), unveiled by AMD on November 30, 2006. This modified version of Socket F, named Socket 1207 FX by AMD, and Socket L1 by NVIDIA, allows for dual-socket, dual-core (four effective cores and eight effective cores in the future) processors in desktop PCs for home enthusiasts.

Socket F Revisions 
All revisions except Socket Fr3 require the usage of registered DDR2 SDRAM. All revisions except Socket Fr1 require a dual-plane power-supply circuit for the CPU.

 Socket Fr1
 Three HyperTransport 2.x links with 1 GHz, single-plane power-supply circuit
 Socket Fr2
 Three HyperTransport 2.x links with 1 GHz, dual-plane power-supply circuit
 Socket Fr3
 Three HyperTransport 2.x links with 1 GHz, unbuffered DDR2 SDRAM (special version for Quad-FX)
 Socket Fr5
 CPU: Three HyperTransport 3.x links with 2.2 GHz
 Motherboards: One HyperTransport 3.x link between CPU with 2.2 GHz, two HT 2.x links with 1 GHz for I/O operations
 Socket Fr6
 Three Hypertransport 3.x links with 2.4 GHz, support for Snoop-Filter (HT-Assist)

See also 
 List of AMD Opteron microprocessors

References

External links 
 Tweakers.net: First benchmarks of Socket F Opterons in databasetest
 Tweakers.net: Pictures of the socket 
 Dailytech: AMD's Next-gen Socket F Revealed
 PCstats: Socket F Near Term Roadmap

AMD server sockets